Francisco Fariñas Gutiérrez (born 2 April 1948) is a Cuban former footballer who competed in the 1976 Summer Olympics.

Club career
Born in Havana, Fariñas came through at Las Cañas before joining Industriales where he spent his entire senior career. His year of birth is also reported as 1949 or 1950.

International career
He represented his country in 10 FIFA World Cup qualifying matches and played two games at the 1976 Summer Olympics. He also played at the 1967 and 1971 Pan American Games.

References

1948 births
Living people
Cuban footballers
Association football forwards
FC Industriales players
Olympic footballers of Cuba
Footballers at the 1976 Summer Olympics
Pan American Games medalists in football
Pan American Games bronze medalists for Cuba
Footballers at the 1967 Pan American Games
Footballers at the 1971 Pan American Games
Sportspeople from Havana
Medalists at the 1971 Pan American Games